Aleksandr Viktorovich Yatsenko (born 22 May 1977) is a Russian actor. He appeared in more than thirty films since 2003.

Selected filmography

References

External links 

1977 births
Living people
Actors from Volgograd
Russian male film actors
Russian male television actors
Recipients of the Nika Award
Russian Academy of Theatre Arts alumni
 
21st-century Russian male actors